Alexis Wilkinson (born 1992) is an American writer and comedian. She gained prominence after she was elected the first African American female president of The Harvard Lampoon.

Wilkinson was a staff writer for Veep and Brooklyn Nine-Nine, and she is a contributing writer to The New Yorker.

Early life and education
Wilkinson was raised in Wheaton, Illinois and Milwaukee, Wisconsin, where she graduated from Nicolet High School. Her mother is a computer engineer and her father died of colon cancer when she was a child.

She attended Harvard University and studied economics, with aspirations of writing for television. Wilkinson joined The Harvard Lampoon writing staff as a freshman, and her junior year she was elected president of the publication, the first African American woman to hold the position.

Career 
Just prior to graduating, Wilkinson sent copies of The Harvard Lampoon to the Harvard alumni trustees and asked for job leads. David Mandel was a recipient and the show runner of Veep; he hired Wilkinson onto the writing staff. She was the only person of color in the writer's room. Wilkinson left Veep to join the writing staff of Brooklyn Nine-Nine in 2016.

She left TV writing to work on her first book. She also consults on ad campaigns.

In November 2019, it was announced that Wilkinson had written an audiobook for Serial Box, called The Co-Founder, about two female entrepreneurs who hire a man to sell their product to Silicon Valley investors. It is also currently being developed into a film.

Personal life 
Wilkinson resides in San Francisco, California.

Awards and nominations 
 2017  Writers Guild of America Award, Veep - Nominee
 2017  Writers Guild of America Award for Comedy/Variety Special, 68th Primetime Emmy Awards  - Nominee
 2018  Writers Guild of America Award, Veep - Winner

References

External links
Official website
Alexis Wilkinson at IMDb

Living people
21st-century American women writers
African-American screenwriters
American television writers
People from Milwaukee
American comedy writers
1992 births
21st-century American screenwriters
21st-century African-American women writers
21st-century African-American writers
African-American female comedians
American women comedians
Harvard University alumni
Writers from Milwaukee